Alen Šket (born 28 March 1988) is a Slovenian volleyball player who plays for ACH Volley. He is also a member of the Slovenia national team.

Honours
 2008–09  Slovenian Cup, with ACH Volley
 2008–09  Slovenian Championship, with ACH Volley
 2009–10  Slovenian Cup, with ACH Volley
 2009–10  Slovenian Championship, with ACH Volley
 2010–11  Slovenian Cup, with ACH Volley
 2010–11  Slovenian Championship, with ACH Volley
 2011–12  Slovenian Cup, with ACH Volley
 2011–12  Slovenian Championship, with ACH Volley
 2012–13  Slovenian Cup, with ACH Volley
 2012–13  Slovenian Championship, with ACH Volley
 2016–17  Turkish Cup, with Fenerbahçe İstanbul
 2017–18  Turkish SuperCup, with Fenerbahçe İstanbul
 2018–19  Turkish SuperCup, with Halkbank Ankara
 2020–21  Slovenian Championship, with Merkur Maribor
 2021–22  Slovenian Cup, with ACH Volley
 2021–22  Slovenian Championship, with ACH Volley

References

External links

 
 Player profile at LegaVolley.it 
 Player profile at Volleybox.net

1988 births
Living people
Sportspeople from Slovenj Gradec
Slovenian men's volleyball players
Mediterranean Games medalists in volleyball
Mediterranean Games bronze medalists for Slovenia
Competitors at the 2009 Mediterranean Games
Slovenian expatriate sportspeople in Italy
Expatriate volleyball players in Italy
Slovenian expatriate sportspeople in Turkey
Expatriate volleyball players in Turkey
Modena Volley players
Fenerbahçe volleyballers
Halkbank volleyball players
Outside hitters